Yehia Nabil Khaled (born 4 September 1971) is an Egyptian former footballer. He competed in the men's tournament at the 1992 Summer Olympics in Barcelona, Spain.

References

External links
 

1971 births
Living people
Egyptian footballers
Egypt international footballers
Olympic footballers of Egypt
Footballers at the 1992 Summer Olympics
Place of birth missing (living people)
Association football defenders
Zamalek SC players